Parathesis is a genus of flowering plants in the family Primulaceae. There are about 95 species distributed from Mexico to South America and the Caribbean. Plants of this genus can be distinguished by glandular papillae on the lobes of the flower corolla and bright yellow anthers.

Species include:
 Parathesis amplifolia Lundell
 Parathesis aurantica Lundell
 Parathesis bicolor Lundell
 Parathesis congesta Lundell
Parathesis crenulata (Vent.) Hook. f. – scratchthroat
 Parathesis eggersiana Mez
 Parathesis glaberima Lundell
 Parathesis palaciosii Pipoly
 Parathesis panamensis Lundell
 Parathesis seibertii Lundell
 Parathesis tenuifolia Lundell
 Parathesis villosa  Lundell
 Parathesis vulgata Lundell

References

 
Primulaceae genera
Taxonomy articles created by Polbot